So Wai Chuen (born 26 March 1988) is a former Hong Kong professional footballer. He played as a centre-back.

Career statistics

International

Hong Kong U-23
As of 15 November 2010

Hong Kong
As of 28 July 2011

Notes and references

1988 births
Living people
Hong Kong footballers
Sun Hei SC players
Hong Kong First Division League players
Hong Kong Premier League players
Eastern Sports Club footballers
TSW Pegasus FC players
Hong Kong international footballers
Footballers at the 2010 Asian Games
Association football central defenders
Asian Games competitors for Hong Kong